Ardozyga psephias is a species of moth in the family Gelechiidae. It was described by Edward Meyrick in 1904. It is found in Australia, where it has been recorded from Western Australia.

The forewings are pale fuscous, irrorated with whitish and sprinkled with dark fuscous. The stigmata are large, dark fuscous and undefined, with the plical obliquely beyond the first discal, sometimes additional dots between and above the discal, and beneath the second discal. The posterior half of the costa is marked with more or less defined white dots alternating with darker spots. The hindwings are light grey, paler towards the base.

References

Ardozyga
Moths described in 1904
Taxa named by Edward Meyrick
Moths of Australia